Stanempista is a genus of snout moths. It was described by Roesler in 1969. It contains only one species Stanempista schawerdae, which is found in Spain.

References

Phycitini
Monotypic moth genera
Moths described in 1927
Moths of Europe
Pyralidae genera